The Men's Volleyball at the Games of the Small States of Europe is a multi sport Events for men's volleyball national teams, it was first introduced in the Second Edition of the Games of the Small States of Europe for men, currently it is held biannually and organized by the European Olympic Committees, controlled by the European Volleyball Confederation, the volleyball federation from Europe.

Results summary

Medal table

References

Sources

European Volleyball Confederation

Volleyball
European volleyball records and statistics